Ropica ochreomaculata is a species of beetle in the family Cerambycidae. It was described by Breuning in 1969. It is known from Borneo.

References

ochreomaculata
Beetles described in 1969